Křivoklátsko Protected Landscape Area (usually abbreviated as Křivoklátsko PLA) is a protected landscape area in the Czech Republic. It lies in the western part of the Central Bohemian Region and a small part of the north-eastern Plzeň Region. Most of the area belongs to the highlands of the Křivoklát Highlands and lies on both banks of the Berounka river.

Křivoklátsko PLA was declared in 1978 to protect a unique area with a mosaic of species rich habitats, mainly large stretches of broadleaf Central European temperate forests. Due to this fact the area was included among the UNESCO Biosphere reserves a year prior to being declared a protected landscape area, in 1977. There are many other habitats, such as dry rock steppes covering the tops of some hills. The area is also notable for its diverse geology, mainly Proterozoic volcanic rocks and Cambrian fossil-rich slates around the village of Skryje, which were made famous by Joachim Barrande.

The fact that such well-preserved landscape lies very close to the Czech capital Prague is due to Křivoklátsko having been the hunting area of Czech kings and princes since the Middle Ages. The protected landscape area is named after the Křivoklát castle in the northern part of Křivoklátsko.

Resources

Protected landscape areas in the Czech Republic
Biosphere reserves of the Czech Republic
Volcanoes of the Czech Republic
Proterozoic volcanism
Geography of the Central Bohemian Region
Tourist attractions in the Central Bohemian Region